Milford Hodge (born March 11, 1961) is a former American football defensive lineman who played four seasons in the National Football League with the New Orleans Saints and New England Patriots. He was drafted by the New England Patriots in the eighth round of the 1985 NFL Draft. He played college football at Washington State University and attended South San Francisco High School in South San Francisco, California. Hodge was also a member of the London Monarchs of the World League of American Football.

References

External links
Just Sports Stats

Living people
1961 births
People from South San Francisco, California
Players of American football from Los Angeles
American football defensive ends
Washington State Cougars football players
New Orleans Saints players
New England Patriots players
London Monarchs players